Andrew Wong Wang-fat  (born 11 December 1943) is a Hong-Kong politician who was the last president of the Legislative Council during British rule. He was the only person of Chinese ethnicity to have served in the position during British rule, supported by the pan-democracy camp.

Andrew Wong was born in Shanghai, Republic of China. He attended Wah Yan College, an all-male Jesuit secondary school in Hong Kong, after which studied at the University of Hong Kong, Syracuse University in the United States and completed an MPhil at the London School of Economics and Political Science (LSE) in the United Kingdom. Wong is often referred to by the nickname "Uncle Fat".

First elected into the Legislative Council of Hong Kong in 1985, Wong was elected by his fellow members of the Council to the position of its president in 1995. He held the position until 30 June 1997, when the sovereignty of Hong Kong was transferred from the United Kingdom to the People's Republic of China.

He served in the Provisional Legislative Council from 1997 to 1998, and was re-elected to the Legislative Council in 1998, and in 2000, after the transfer of sovereignty. He lost his seat at the 2004 Legislative Council elections.

Wong served in the Sha Tin District Board from 1981 to 1991. He was also a lecturer in the Department of Government and Public Administration of the Chinese University of Hong Kong.

In 2021, Wong published 60 Chinese Poems in English Verse. The book is a collection of 60 quatrain poems from the Tang Dynasty which Wong translated from ancient Chinese into English. In his translation Wong focuses on translating into accentual verse to make the poems melodious to the English ear.

References

External links
Profile on the LegCo website
Wong's poetry translation website

Members of the Executive Council of Hong Kong
1943 births
Living people
Academic staff of the Chinese University of Hong Kong
Politicians from Shanghai
Hong Kong pan-democrats
HKFS people
Alumni of Wah Yan
District councillors of Sha Tin District
Members of the Provisional Legislative Council
HK LegCo Members 1985–1988
HK LegCo Members 1988–1991
HK LegCo Members 1991–1995
HK LegCo Members 1995–1997
HK LegCo Members 1998–2000
HK LegCo Members 2000–2004
Educators from Shanghai

Presidents of the Legislative Council of Hong Kong